David E. Garland (born September 24, 1947) served as the interim president of Baylor University in Waco, Texas. His term began in June 2016 amid the Baylor sexual assault scandal and resignation of former president Ken Starr. Garland's term concluded on May 31, 2017.

Career
Garland is a professor of Christian scriptures at Baylor's George W. Truett Theological Seminary, where he served as the seminary's fourth dean from June 2007 to June 2015. During this time, he was Baylor's interim president from August 2008 through May 2010 and interim provost from July 2014 to June 2015. He also served on the Southern Baptist Theological Seminary faculty for 21 years, was chairman of the biblical division from 1992 to 1997, and was the Ernest and Mildred Hogan Professor of New Testament Interpretation from 1993 to 1997. A magna cum laude graduate of Oklahoma Baptist University and a U.S. Navy veteran, he received his master of divinity and doctoral degrees from Southern Baptist Theological Seminary and also completed postgraduate work at Eberhardt-Karls Universitat in Tübingen, Germany and Macquarie University in Sydney, Australia.

In addition to his administrative duties, Garland is a New Testament scholar, having authored, coauthored and edited 24 books, including commentaries on the gospels of Matthew, Mark and Luke, Acts, 1 and 2 Corinthians, Colossians and Philemon. His publishers include Mercer University Press, Baker Books and Zondervan Publishing. He has also published more than 50 articles and contributed to the DVD series Deeper Connections, produced by Zondervan. His Mark: NIV Application Commentary received a Silver Medallion from the CBA in 1996. "The Gospel of Mark" in Zondervan Illustrated Bible Backgrounds Commentary received the Gold Medallion Award from the ECPA in 2003. 1 Corinthians (Baker exegetical commentary on the New Testament) received a Silver Medallion from the ECPA and an Award of Merit from Christianity Today in 2004. His book The Theology of Mark (2015) was nominated as a finalist in the Bible Reference category for the ECPA Christian Book Award. He is an elected member of Studiorum Novi Testamenti Societas.

Garland has preached in churches throughout the U.S., Australia and Africa and has served as interim pastor of 16 churches in Kentucky, Indiana and Texas.

Garland's late wife Dr. Diana S. Richmond Garland served as the founding dean of Baylor's School of Social Work, which was renamed in her honor. They coauthored several books including Flawed Families of the Bible: How God's Grace Works Through Imperfect Relationships (Brazos Press).

Controversy 
In 2017, the Houston Chronicle reported that a court filing revealed what Garland, as Baylor University interim president, stated in online communication with a school administrator. Garland cited an NPR show in which the author chronicled alcoholism in college, saying that the piece "added another perspective for me of what is going on in the heads of some women who may seem willingly to make themselves victims."

Works

Books

As editor

Articles and Chapters

Notes

Sources
 https://web.archive.org/web/20160618044528/http://www.baylor.edu/president/index.php?id=57010
 http://www.baylor.edu/alumni/magazine/1304/index.php?id=924922
 http://www.baylor.edu/truett/index.php?id=927919
 http://www.baylor.edu/social_work/index.php?id=926090
 http://www.baylor.edu/mediacommunications/news.php?action=story&story=181484

Living people
1947 births
American biblical scholars
Baylor University faculty
Presidents of Baylor University
Southern Baptist Theological Seminary alumni
University of Tübingen alumni
People from Crisfield, Maryland
Macquarie University alumni
New Testament scholars
Bible commentators